Derek Mombourquette (born July 14, 1980) is a Canadian politician. He represents the district of Sydney-Whitney Pier as a member of the Nova Scotia Liberal Party.

Early life and education
Mombourquette attended Cape Breton University, serving as both President and Vice-President of the student union.

Political career
Mombourquette served on the municipal council of the Cape Breton Regional Municipality from 2008 to 2012.

In 2013, Mombourquette ran for the Liberals in Sydney-Whitney Pier in the 2013 election, losing to incumbent MLA Gordie Gosse.

He was elected to the Nova Scotia House of Assembly in a by-election on July 14, 2015 for the riding of Sydney-Whitney Pier.

Mombourquette was re-elected in the 2017 election. On June 15, 2017, he was appointed to the Executive Council of Nova Scotia as Minister of Municipal Affairs. On July 5, 2018, Mombourquette was moved to Minister of Energy and Mines in a cabinet shuffle.

Mombourquette was re-elected in the 2021 election, however the Rankin Liberals lost government becoming the Official Opposition.

Election record

References

Living people
Members of the Executive Council of Nova Scotia
Nova Scotia Liberal Party MLAs
Nova Scotia municipal councillors
People from Sydney, Nova Scotia
21st-century Canadian politicians
1980 births